Otoniel Gonzaga (born 30 September 1913, date of death unknown) was a Filipino sports shooter. He competed in three events at the 1936 Summer Olympics. He was killed during World War II.

References

External links
 

1913 births
1940s deaths
Filipino male sport shooters
Olympic shooters of the Philippines
Shooters at the 1936 Summer Olympics
Place of birth missing
Filipino military personnel killed in World War II